Christian Giencke (June 9, 1896 – May 19, 1967) was a German politician of the Christian Democratic Union (CDU) and former member of the German Bundestag.

Life 
Giencke, who joined the CDU after 1945, had been its chairman in the Husum district since 1947.

From 1949 to 1965 he was a member of the German Bundestag, into which he always moved as a directly elected member of parliament for the constituency Husum - Südtondern - Eiderstedt.

Literature

References

1896 births
1967 deaths
Members of the Bundestag for Schleswig-Holstein
Members of the Bundestag 1961–1965
Members of the Bundestag 1957–1961
Members of the Bundestag 1953–1957
Members of the Bundestag 1949–1953
Members of the Bundestag for the Christian Democratic Union of Germany